Many private companies have ceased operations in Russia or donated or matched donations to the Ukrainian government or Ukrainian organizations in response to Russia's seizure of Ukrainian territory in 2014 and 2022. Others have applied various sanctions. 

By the count of researchers at the Yale School of Management, 350 companies had withdrawn by 15 March 2022, more than 400 by 18 March, and almost 1,000 by 4 May.

Companies suspending operations in Russia

Companies providing donations and match funding to Ukraine

See also

 List of foreign aid to Ukraine during the Russo-Ukrainian War
 Fundraising for Ukraine during the 2022 Russian invasion of Ukraine
 Starlink satellite services in Ukraine
 United24
 International sanctions during the 2022 Russian invasion of Ukraine

References

External links
Yale School of Management: Yale CELI List of Companies Leaving and Staying in Russia

2022 in international relations
2021 in international relations
Reactions to 2020s events
International reactions to armed conflicts
Sanctions and boycotts during the Russo-Ukrainian War